Muhammad Tahir (born 4 January 1994, in Jayapura) is an Indonesian professional footballer who plays as a central midfielder for  for Liga 1 club RANS Nusantara, on loan from Persipura Jayapura.

Club career

Persipura Jayapura
Tahir started his career when in SSB Tunas Muda Hamadi, then was recruited by Persipura U21. In 2016, Tahir joined to senior team of Persipura in the 2016 Piala Bhayangkara. He and four other players from Persipura U21 were recruited by Osvaldo Lessa, and Tahir became one of the players who gained the most attention.

Tahir was included in the squad for the Indonesia Soccer Championship. He made his first professional debut against Bali United in the second week ISC A.

Loan to RANS Nusantara
On 27 January 2023, Tahir signed a contract with Liga 1 club Rans Nusantara, on loan from Persipura Jayapura. Tahir made his league debut for the club in a 1–2 lose against Arema.

Career statistics

Club

Honours

Club
Persipura Jayapura
 Indonesia Soccer Championship A: 2016

References

External links
 Muhammad Tahir at Soccerway
 Muhammad Tahir at Liga Indonesia

1995 births
Living people
Bugis people
Indonesian footballers
People from Jayapura
Sportspeople from Papua
Persipura Jayapura players
Association football midfielders
Association football defenders